Route 125 (Jubilee Avenue) is a city route in Winnipeg, Manitoba, Canada.  At only 1.6 kilometers in length, it is the shortest designated city route, running from an interchange with Route 42 (Pembina Highway) to Route 62 (Osborne Street).

Jubilee Avenue is a collector road with two lanes in each direction, running through residential areas in Fort Garry and Fort Rouge. The speed limit is 50 km/h (30 mph) for the entire length of the route.  The street is named in commemoration of Queen Victoria's Diamond Jubilee in 1897.

Major intersections

Notable Locations
 Bridge Drive In (BDI)
 Elm Park Bridge

References

125